The U.S. Bilateral Relations Fact Sheets, also known as the Background Notes, are a series of works by the United States Department of State. These publications include facts about the land, people, history, government, political conditions, economy, and foreign relations of independent states, some dependencies, and areas of special sovereignty. The series is available online through the State Department's website.

References

External links
 U.S. Bilateral Relations Fact Sheets on the State Department website

United States Department of State
Publications of the United States government
United States Department of State publications
Bureau of Public Affairs
Foreign relations of the United States